Shotwick is a former civil parish, now in the parish of Puddington, in Cheshire West and Chester, England. It contains 23 buildings that are recorded in the National Heritage List for England as designated listed buildings. Of these, one is listed at Grade I, the highest grade, two are listed at Grade II*, the middle grade, and the others are at Grade II. Apart from the village of Shotwick, the parish is entirely rural. Most of the listed buildings are in the village, and include houses, St Michael's Church and structures in the churchyard, and Shotwick Hall with associated structures. Outside the village, the listed buildings are domestic or related to farming.

Key

Buildings

See also
Listed buildings in Puddington
Listed buildings in Shotwick Park

References
Citations

Sources

 

 

Listed buildings in Cheshire West and Chester
Lists of listed buildings in Cheshire